Agathocles (Agathoklḗs; 361–289 BC) was a Greek tyrant of Syracuse (317–289 BC) and self-styled king of Sicily (304–289 BC).

Biography
Agathocles was born at Thermae Himeraeae (modern name Termini Imerese) in Sicily. The son of a potter who had moved to Syracuse in about 343 BC, he learned his father's trade, but afterwards entered the army along with his brother Antander. In 333 BC he married the widow of his patron Damas, a distinguished and wealthy citizen. He was twice banished for attempting to overthrow the oligarchical party in Syracuse.

In 317 BC he returned with an army of mercenaries under a solemn oath to observe the democratic constitution which was established after they took the city. Having massacred the oligarchs and the richest of the citizenry, he thus made himself master of Syracuse, and he created a strong army and fleet and subdued the greater part of Sicily.

War with Carthage followed. In 311 BC Agathocles was defeated in the Battle of the Himera River and besieged in Syracuse. In 310 BC he made a desperate effort to break through the blockade and attack Carthage. He landed at Cap Bon in August 310 BC, and was able to defeat the Carthaginians for the first time, and establish a camp near Tunis. He then turned east, and tried to take over trading coastal cities such as Neapolis and Hadrumetum, and on this occasion concluded an alliance with Aelymas, king of the Libyans according to Diodorus of Sicily, in an attempt to surround and isolate Carthage. After capturing Hadrumetum, Thapsus and other coastal towns, Agathocles turned his attention to central Tunisia. Before or during this campaign, he broke his alliance with Ailymas, whom he pursued and killed, but he kept his Numidian army, including war chariots they built.

In 309/8 BC, Agathocles began trying to sway Ophellas, ruler of Cyrenaica, as he was likely to prove a useful ally in Agathocles' war against the Carthaginians. In order to gain his allegiance he promised to cede to Ophellas whatever conquests their combined forces might make in Africa, reserving to himself only the possession of Sicily. Ophellas gathered a powerful army from the homeland of his wife Euthydike (a descendant of Miltiades), Athens, where many citizens felt disgruntled after having lost their voting rights. Despite the natural obstacles which presented themselves on his route, Ophellas succeeded in reaching the Carthaginian territories after a toilsome and perilous march of more than two months. He was received by Agathocles with every demonstration of friendship, and the two armies encamped near each other, but a few days later Agathocles betrayed his new ally, by attacking the camp of the Cyrenaeans and having Ophellas killed. The Cyrenean troops, left without a leader, went over to Agathocles.

Following several victories he was at last completely defeated (307 BC) and fled secretly to Sicily. After concluding peace with Carthage in 306 BC, Agathocles styled himself king of Sicily in 304 BC, and established his rule over the Greek cities of the island more firmly than ever. A peace treaty with Carthage left him in control of Sicily east of the Halycus River. Even in his old age he displayed the same restless energy, and is said to have been contemplating a fresh attack on Carthage at the time of his death.

His last years were plagued by ill-health and the turbulence of his grandson Archagathus, at whose instigation he is said to have been poisoned; according to others, he died a natural death. He was a born leader of mercenaries, and, although he did not shrink from cruelty to gain his ends, he afterwards showed himself a mild and popular "tyrant". Agathocles restored the Syracusan democracy on his death bed and did not want his sons to succeed him as king.

Agathocles was married three times. His first wife, by whom he had two sons, was the widow of his patron Damas,  Archagathus and his brother, who were both murdered in 307 BC. His second wife was Alcia and they had a daughter called Lanassa, who married as the second wife of King Pyrrhus of Epirus, and a son, Agathocles, who was murdered in a succession dispute shortly before his father's death. His third wife was the Greek Ptolemaic Princess Theoxena, who was the second daughter of Berenice I from her first husband Philip and was a stepdaughter of Ptolemy I Soter. Theoxena bore Agathocles two children: Archagathus and Theoxena. Theoxena survived Agathocles. He had further descendants from his second and third marriage.

Legacy
Agathocles was cited as an example "Of those who become princes through their crimes" in chapter 8 of Niccolò Machiavelli's treatise on politics -  The Prince (1513).
He was described as behaving as a criminal at every stage of his career. Machiavelli claimed: 

Machiavelli goes on to reason that Agathocles' success, in contrast to other criminal tyrants, was due to his ability to commit his crimes quickly and ruthlessly, and states that cruelties are best used when they

However, he came to "glory" as much as he did brutality by repelling invading Carthaginians and winning the loyalty of the denizens of his land.

Family tree of Agathocles

Primary sources
 Diodorus Siculus Library of History Books 19–21.
 Justin, Epitome of Pompeius Trogus Book 22.
 Polyaenus 5.3
 Polybius 9.23

References

Cited sources

Bibliography

Further reading

External links

Coinage of Agathocles
Agathocles- Encyclopædia Britannica
Agathocles of Syracuse- Ancient History Encyclopedia

|width=25% align=center|Preceded by:oligarchy position previously held by Timoleon in 337 BC
|width=25% align=center|Tyrant of Syracuse317 BC289 BC
|width=25% align=center|Succeeded by:Hicetas
|-

361 BC births
289 BC deaths
Ancient Greek generals
Sicilian tyrants
4th-century BC Syracusans
Ancient Himeraeans
Greek exiles
4th-century BC Greek people
3rd-century BC Syracusans
4th-century BC monarchs
3rd-century BC monarchs
People of the Sicilian Wars